Revici's Guided Chemotherapy is an ineffective cancer treatment devised by Emanuel Revici (1896–1997).

Revici's early work on experimental chemical-based treatments for cancer between 1920–1941 attracted a degree of support. However his work increasingly found disfavor with the scientific and medical communities and his license was revoked in 1993.

Revici's Guided Chemotherapy is based on the idea that all illness is caused by an "imbalance" of metabolism. The treatment is to give a mixture of chemical substances (usually including lipid alcohol and various metals) by mouth or injection. A Clinical Appraisal Group was organized in January 1963 to evaluate Revici's cancer treatment. The group concluded that the treatment has no value. The American Cancer Society notes that Revici's Guided "chemotherapy" is different from modern conventional chemotherapy, and states: "Available scientific evidence does not support claims that Revici's guided chemotherapy is effective in treating cancer or any other disease. It may also cause potentially serious side effects."

In 1997 a biography of Dr. Revici was published which included an overview of his theories and a history and refutation of the above sources.

See also 
 List of ineffective cancer treatments

References

Further reading
 
 Revici, Emanuel (1961). "Research In Physiopathology As Basis Of Guided Chemotherapy With Special Application To Cancer"

Pseudoscience
Alternative cancer treatments